This is an alphabetical list of female novelists who were active in England and Wales, and the Kingdom of Great Britain and Ireland before approximately 1800. Nota bene: authors of novels are the focus of this list, though many of these writers worked in more than one genre.

Novelists

A

B

C

D

E

F

G

H

I

J

K

L

M

N

O

P

R

S

T

V

W

Y

See also

Notes

Resources 
Backscheider, Paula, and John Richetti, eds. Popular Fiction by Women, 1660–1730: An Anthology. Oxford: OUP, 1996. (Internet Archive)
Ballaster, Ros. Seductive Forms: Women's Amatory Fiction from 1684 to 1740. Clarendon Press, 1992.
Blain, Virginia, et al., eds. The Feminist Companion to Literature in English. New Haven and London: Yale UP, 1990. (Internet Archive)
Buck, Claire, ed.The Bloomsbury Guide to Women's Literature. Prentice Hall, 1992. (Internet Archive)
Corman, Brian. Women Novelists Before Jane Austen: The Critics and Their Canons. University of Toronto Press, 2008. https://doi.org/10.3138/9781442689633
Oxford Dictionary of National Biography. Oxford: OUP, 2004. 
Prescott, Sarah. Women, Authorship and Literary Culture, 1690–1740. Palgrave, 2003. 
Robertson, Fiona, ed. Women's Writing, 1778–1838. Oxford: OUP, 2001. (Internet Archive)
Schellenberg, Betty A. The Professionalization of Women Writers in Eighteenth-Century Britain. Cambridge University Press, 2005. . 
Schlueter, Paul, and June Schlueter. An encyclopedia of British women writers. Rutgers University Press, 1998. (Internet Archive) 
Spencer, Jane. The Rise of the Woman Novelist: From Aphra Behn to Jane Austen. 1986.   
Spender, Dale. Mothers of the novel: 100 good women writers before Jane Austen. London/NY:Pandora, 1986. (Internet Archive)
Todd, Janet, ed. British Women Writers: a critical reference guide. London: Routledge, 1989. (Internet Archive)
Todd, Janet. A Dictionary of British and American women writers, 1660-1800. Totowa, N.J.: Rowman & Allanheld, 1985. (Internet Archive)
Williams, K. "Women Writers and the Rise of the Novel." The History of British Women's Writing, 1690–1750. Edited by R. Ballaster. Series: The History of British Women's Writing. Palgrave Macmillan, 2010. https://doi.org/10.1057/9780230298354_7

External links 
Bibliography of Early Modern Women Writers That Are In Print
British Women Romantic Poets An electronic collection of texts for the period (1789–1832).
The Brown University Women Writers Project Emphasis is on pre-Victorian women writers.
A Celebration of Women Writers  A major focus of this site is the development of on-line editions of older, often rare, out-of-copyright works. 
Emory Women Writers Resource Project A collection of texts by women writing from the seventeenth century through the early twentieth century. 
List of biographical dictionaries Collectively, the resources at this site "provide information about any 17th-century British woman writer one could imagine."
Luminarium  An online Anthology of English Literature
Romantic Circles, a refereed scholarly website devoted to the study of Romantic-period literature and culture.
Women Romantic-Era Writers
The Women Writers Archive: Early Modern Women Writers Online
The Women's Print History Project

 

Lists of novelists
Lists of women writers by format
Lists of British women